Ferdinand Tubban is a Filipino politician from the province of Kalinga in the Philippines. He is a former Governor of Kalinga. He was first elected as Mayor of Tabuk City and served there for three terms. He is the first Governor of the province to be elected  under protest. In the 2019 Philippine general election on May 13, 2019, he defeated the then Vice Governor James Edduba by just ten votes.

Initially, the rival former Vice-Governor declared not to protest due to lack of money but after Edduba's supporters pass the hat and convinced Edduba that it was not about him but about his supporters, Edduba's camp filed a motion before the Commission on Elections against Tubban. In February, 2020, the motion filed by Edubba before the Commission on Elections showed that Edduba recovered a net of seven votes, which is more than the required “substantial recovery” of 20 percent. Aside from the seven votes, the former vice governor had a total of 20 claimed ballots in his favor, which is more than enough to offset the winning margin of Tubban in the 2019 polls. Edduba, who ran under the Lakas Christian Muslim Democrats party, now has a winning margin of 17 votes. As of September 28, 2020, the case is pending before the Commission on Election. He eventually lost his reelection bid in the May 9 2022 Philippine general election to Edduba.

References

Living people
Governors of Kalinga (province)
PDP–Laban politicians
Year of birth missing (living people)